Histoea is a genus of moths in the subfamily Arctiinae. The genus was erected by Francis Walker in 1854.

Species
 Histioea amazonica Butler, 1876
 Histioea bellatrix Walker, 1854
 Histioea boliviana Druce, 1890
 Histioea cepheus Cramer, 1779
 Histioea excreta Draudt, 1915
 Histioea falerina Druce, 1907
 Histioea glaucozona Druce, 1898
 Histioea hoffmannsi Rothschild, 1911
 Histioea imaon Hampson, 1898
 Histioea maon Druce, 1896
 Histioea meldolae Butler, 1876
 Histioea paraensis Machado Jnr. & Rego Barros, 1971
 Histioea paulina Walker, 1866
 Histioea peruana Gaede, 1926
 Histioea peruviana Draudt, 1915
 Histioea proserpina Hübner, 1827
 Histioea tina (Walker, 1854)

References

External links

Arctiinae